Fabresema is a genus of moths in the subfamily Arctiinae. The genus was erected by Jeremy Daniel Holloway in 1979.

Species
 Fabresema bicornuta Holloway, 1979
 Fabresema catherinae Holloway, 1979
 Fabresema cheesmanae Holloway, 1979
 Fabresema costiplaga Holloway, 1979
 Fabresema elisabethae Holloway, 1979
 Fabresema flavibasalis Holloway, 1979
 Fabresema gerardi Holloway, 1979
 Fabresema grisea Holloway, 1979
 Fabresema obliqua Holloway, 1979
 Fabresema sarramea Holloway, 1979
 Fabresema suffusa Holloway, 1979
 Fabresema sylviae Holloway, 1979
 Fabresema toma Holloway, 1979
 Fabresema valeriae Holloway, 1979

References

External links

Lithosiini